Bolton Abbey, Moone, County Kildare is a Cistercian monastery, founded in 1965. It was established by monks from Mount St. Joseph Abbey, Roscrea, and became an independent monastery and abbey in 1977. The monastery works a dairy farm on its property. 

The farm and house were donated by Dr. Robert Farnan.  The monastery was established by Fr Ambrose Farrington and Br Kieran Dooley from Roscrea and officially opened in 1965. In 2015 it celebrated its 50th anniversary.

Superiors / Abbots
 1965 - Dom Ambrose Farrington - Superior
 1974 - Dom Bennedict Kearns - Superior
 1977 - Abbot Benedict Kearns
 1994 - Abbot Ambrose Farrington
 2000 - Abbot Eoin De Bhalraithe (abbot 20/05/2000–20/05/2006)
 2006 - Abbot Peter Garvey (1937–2014)
 2012 - Abbot (Dom) Michael Ryan (abbot 2012–)

References

Trappist monasteries in the Republic of Ireland
Cistercian monasteries in the Republic of Ireland
Religious organizations established in 1965